Carousel is a 1978 Wizex studio album. The album peaked at No. 7 in the Swedish albums chart. The album includes the Svensktoppen hit song "Se dig i din spegel".

Track listing

Side A

Side B

Charts

References 

1978 albums
Wizex albums